Tignish Shore (population: 57) is a rural municipality in Prince Edward Island, Canada. It is located in the Lot 1 township.

Demographics 

References 

Communities in Prince County, Prince Edward Island
Rural municipalities in Prince Edward Island